John McCaslin Amberg (March 6, 1929 – May 4, 2004) was an American football defensive back who played for the New York Giants during the 1951 and 1952 NFL seasons. A few of his teammates were Tom Landry, Frank Gifford, Emlen Tunnell, Charlie Conerly and Kyle Rote. His career was cut short due to the Korean War. He entered the Marine Corp and played football at Quantico in 1953. He was named "All Service" player of the year by the Washington Touchdown Club. He also played college football at Kansas. He later became a President of the Los Angeles Chapter of the NFL Alumni which served in part to help "at risk youth". Later in life he was the President of Gem-O-Lite plastics Corp. at 5525 Cahuenga Blvd. in North Hollywood, California. Gem-O-Lite, among other things was a movie industry favorite for acrylic materials in the 60s, 70s, 80s and 90s.

1929 births
People from Johnson County, Kansas
Players of American football from Kansas
Kansas Jayhawks football players
New York Giants players
2004 deaths